Alejandro Chomski (27 November 1968 – 5 November 2022) was an Argentine film director and screenwriter. As of early 2020, he has directed 16 films with another film in post-production and one announced production. His film Hoy y mañana was screened in the Un Certain Regard section at the 2003 Cannes Film Festival.

Chomski died in his sleep on November 5, 2022, at the age of 53.

Filmography
 Alexander and the Terrible, Horrible, No Good, Very Bad Day (1997)
 Dry Martini (1998)
 Hoy y mañana (2003)
 Feel the Noise (2007)
 A Beautiful Life (2008)
 Asleep in the Sun (2010)
 In the Country of the Last Things'' (2011)

References

External links

1968 births
2022 deaths
Argentine film directors
Argentine screenwriters
Male screenwriters
Argentine male writers
Writers from Buenos Aires